The Royale Belge former headquarters is a functionalist building from 1967 to 1970, located in Watermael-Boitsfort, a municipality of Brussels, Belgium..

History

Construction began on 4 April 1967, followed by formal inauguration on 25 June 1970. The client was the insurer Royale Belge. After it was merged into the French AXA in 1999, the complex was sold to Cofinimmo and leased back until 2018. AXA moved its Belgian headquarters to the / (former Electrabel headquarters) in 2017. The United States became the new owner of the buildings on the /, with the intention of housing the US Embassy. However, the structure proved unsuitable for supporting heavy bulletproof glass. To avoid drastic transformations, the Brussels-Capital Region's government placed the building on its safeguarding list, after which the Americans abandoned the project.

Description
The cross-shaped design is by the architects René Stapels and Pierre Dufau, who were inspired, among other things, by Eero Saarinen's John Deere World Headquarters (Moline, Illinois). The exterior consists of corten steel and bronze-colored smoke-colored windows. Thanks to the landscape architects Jean Delogne and Claude Rebold, the whole is harmoniously planted between ponds and greenery.

In 2023 Royale Belge got renovated by the british architecture firm Caruso St John and Antwerp based Bovenbouw architectuur.

See also
 Axa-Royale Belge Tower

External links
 Voormalige Royale Belge (Inventaris Bouwkundig Erfgoed)
 dss.plus
 bma.brussels

Notes

Buildings and structures in Brussels
Watermael-Boitsfort
Protected heritage sites in Brussels
Functionalist architecture